The Hanover Square Rooms or the Queen's Concert Rooms were assembly rooms established, principally for musical performances, on the corner of Hanover Square, London, by Sir John Gallini in partnership with Johann Christian Bach and Carl Friedrich Abel in 1774. For exactly one century this was the principal concert venue in London. The premises were demolished in 1900.

History of the Rooms

The site had previously been occupied by a mill, hence its previous name Mill Field and that of the currently adjoining Mill Street. Originally the property of Earl of Plymouth, leased out to Lord Dillon, in June 1774 it was sold for £5,000 to Viscount Wenman, who on the same day conveyed it to Gallini, Bach and Abel. Gallini owned half the freehold and each of the other two a quarter. On the site formerly occupied by a garden and office, they constructed, as extensions to the house, assembly rooms for concerts and public meetings. In addition there was a small room off the North side of the main room and a larger room on the ground floor beneath it.

The concert hall there, where concerts started under Bach in February 1775, became one of the principal musical venues in London. For these concerts the convention was that "The Ladies' tickets are Black, and the Gentlemen's Red." An entry from April 1776 in the diary of Edward Piggot gives the following description of a concert:

In November 1776 Gallini bought out the shares of his partners to become the sole owner of the freehold. Bach and Abel, continuing the tradition of subscription concerts they had started together in 1763, carried on organising festinos in the Rooms until 1783, when Gallini's father-in-law Lord Abingdon withdrew his financial support. Until his imprisonment in 1795 for libellous statements concerning a "pettifogging lawyer" who had allegedly cheated him, Lord Abingdon switched his allegiance to the rival orchestra in the Pantheon.  From 1783 to 1793 programming was arranged by the violinist Wilhelm Cramer who led the group "The Professional Concerts", advertised as founded by "eminent professors of music, many years resident in London." The Rooms enjoyed royal patronage from 1785 to 1793, with George III and Queen Charlotte frequent concert-goers. The King even had a room set aside as the "Queen's Tea Room," to which he donated a large gilt mirror for the mantelpiece. In 1776 parallel series of concerts was started in the Rooms by the violinist and impresario Johann Peter Salomon. The Rooms were used by the Concert of Ancient Music from 1804 onwards; for the annual benefit performance of Handel's Messiah for the Royal Society of Musicians from 1785 to 1848; from 1833 onwards by the Philharmonic Society, established in 1813 under patronage of the Prince Regent; and, from 1848 until its dissolution in 1861, by the Amateur Musical Society, a choral society founded by Henry David Leslie in 1847.  The estrangement in 1813 between the Prince Regent and Beau Brummell is reported to have taken place at a fancy dress ball in these Rooms, where Brummell, on not being recognized by the Prince, asked one of his companions in a stage whisper, "Alvanley, who's your fat friend?"

Over the years the Hanover Square Rooms were visited by many leading musicians and performers including Joseph Haydn (1791–1794), Johann Nepomuk Hummel (performances of Haydn piano sonata, 1791, and Mozart piano concerto, 1792) Harriet Wainwright (whose opera Comala premiered in 1792) Felix Mendelssohn (1842, first performance of Scottish Symphony), Niccolò Paganini (performing to empty benches, to his chagrin, 1834), Franz Liszt (1840), Anton Rubinstein  (1842), Joseph Joachim (performing the Beethoven violin concerto at the age of twelve under Mendelssohn's baton, 1844), Hector Berlioz (1848 and 1853), Clara Schumann (1856) and Jenny Lind (the "Swedish nightingale", performing with her husband the pianist Otto Goldschmidt, 1856). The concerts of Haydn, organised through lengthy negotiations with Salomon, featured the first nine of his so-called London symphonies, Nos. 93–101. In a diary entry from 1791, Charles Burney records:

In 1856, after the fourth concert in which she had participated—programmed for five hours with organ arrangements of her husband Robert Schumann's music during the interval—Clara Schumann wrote, "This was really the ne plus ultra of a bad concert. I felt ashamed of myself among all this dreadful stuff." On the arrangement for organ of  Schumann's piano duet Geburtstagmarsch from his 12 Klavierstücke, Op. 85, she wrote that it "was one of those incomprehensible things that could happen nowhere but in England."

The Hanover Square Rooms were also used for some of the first performances in England of J. S. Bach's instrumental and choral music during the English Bach revival. In the first two decades of the nineteenth century, Samuel Wesley performed his violin sonatas with Salamon and arrangements of his organ music for two players with Vincent Novello, sometimes with orchestral accompaniment; Mendelssohn performed a prelude and fugue on the organ in 1840 in a concert arranged by Prince Albert; and in 1854 William Sterndale Bennett, one of the founding members of the Bach Society five years previously, conducted the first English performance of the St. Matthew Passion.

Benefit balls for the Royal Academy of Music were held regularly in the Rooms and attended by the Royal Family. After the 1835 ball, Benjamin Disraeli wrote to his sister:

The Rooms were used for many different purposes apart from music and balls, including public meetings ranging from lectures on the Church of England to displays of crewel embroidery. There were also medical talks, including, on 1 March 1842, a lecture by the Scottish surgeon James Braid who gave one of the first public demonstrations of what he called neuro-hypnotism or "nervous sleep" by sending 18 members of the audience simultaneously into a trance.

In 1848, with both of Gallini's nieces no longer alive, the Rooms were acquired by the music publisher Robert Cocks. Hector Berlioz narrated a performing visit he made in 1853:

From 1862 onwards, having been completely refurbished, the concert-hall was used by the Royal Academy of Music. The Rooms were used from 1868 to 1874 for meetings of the women's suffrage movement: in 1868, Emily Faithfull lectured on "The Claim of Woman"; in 1870 the second meeting of the  recently formed London National Society for Women's Suffrage was held in the Rooms, presided over by Clementia Taylor (wife of the MP Peter Alfred Taylor) and addressed by Helen Taylor, Harriet Grote (wife of George Grote) and Millicent Fawcett; in 1873 a similar public meeting was addressed by Lady Anna Eliza Mary Gore-Langton (wife of the MP William Gore-Langton), and Eliza Sturge (niece of Joseph Sturge).

The last concert of the Royal Academy took place in 1874. The following year the property was sold and became the premises of the Hanover Square Club, which had already been holding committee meetings there since ownership passed to Cocks. The buildings were demolished in 1900.

Gallery

Notes

References

, Account with contemporary newspaper reports of attempts to persuade Haydn to visit London

External links

Hanover Square and neighbourhood, British History Online, containing a detailed history of the Hanover Square Rooms taken from 
Gallini family website with details of the activities of Giovanni Gallini
Berlioz in London, account of concerts in Hanover Square Rooms in 1848 and 1853
Haydn, Part 2 of J. Cuthbert Hadden's 1902 biography
Tate papers on Thomas Gainsborough, Tate Gallery
Glass transparency showbox of Thomas Gainsborough, Victoria and Albert Museum
High art in hairdressing Report in the New York Times on a hairdressers' exhibition in Hanover Square Rooms, 1874.

1774 establishments in England
1875 disestablishments in England
Assembly rooms
Dance venues in England
Former concert halls in London
Former buildings and structures in the City of Westminster
Joseph Haydn
Demolished buildings and structures in London
Buildings and structures demolished in 1900